Arjun Bahadur Thapa (born 12 January 1956) is a Nepali diplomat and former General Secretary of SAARC.

Personal life
He is married to Pabitra Thapa and has three kids: Anuja, Regina, and Ajit Thapa. He is the eighth descendant of Anglo-Nepalese war Bhakti Thapa Bhakti Thapa.

Education
He completed his Masters in International Law (Honours) at Peoples' Friendship University, Moscow, in 1983 and a diploma in Environmental Management at The University of Adelaide, Australia, in 1994. He studied in Moscow for 6 years, then leaving to Nepal.

Career
Thapa has held many positions during his career. He was the Secretary General of SAARC, and was foreign secretary of the Republic of Nepal. :

 Secretary general of SAARC (1 March 2014 – 1 March 2017)
 Foreign Secretary, Ministry of Foreign Affairs of Nepal (21 July 2013 – February 2014)
 Joint Secretary, Head of Regional Organization Division (SAARC & BIMSTEC) and Spokesperson, Ministry of Foreign Affairs of Nepal (April 2012 – July 21, 2013)
 Joint Secretary, Head of Europe-Americas Division, Administration Division, SAARC and BIMSTEC and Spokesperson, Ministry of Foreign Affairs of Nepal (February 2012 – April 2013)
 Ambassador Extraordinary and Plenipotentiary of Nepal to the United Arab Emirates (December 2007 – January 2012)
 Joint Secretary, Head of the SAARC and Administration Divisions and Spokesperson, Ministry of Foreign Affairs of Nepal (February 2007 – December 2007)
 Deputy Permanent Representative/Minister Plenipotentiary, Permanent Mission of Nepal to the UN, New York (August 2006 – February 2007)
 Charge d' Affaires, a.i., Permanent Mission of Nepal to the UN, New York (November 2005 – August 2006)
 Deputy Permanent Representative/ Minister Plenipotentiary, Permanent Mission of Nepal to the UN, New York (December 2002 – November 2005)
 Joint Secretary, East, South East, Far East and the Pacific Division, Ministry of Foreign Affairs of Nepal (Joined the Diplomatic Service through open competition) (June 1999 – December 2002)
 Under Secretary, International Law and Treaties Division, Ministry of Law and Justice (1994–99)
 Assistant Secretary, International Law and Treaties Division, Ministry of Law and Justice (1993–94)
 Section Officer, International Law and Treaties Division Ministry of Law and Justice (1983–93)

References

External links
 SHARC Secretary General's Homepage 
 
 SAARC Homepage

1956 births
Living people
Nepalese diplomats
Peoples' Friendship University of Russia alumni
Secretaries General of the South Asian Association for Regional Cooperation
University of Adelaide alumni